Darkush Subdistrict  is a Syrian nahiyah (subdistrict) located in Jisr al-Shughur District in Idlib.  According to the Syria Central Bureau of Statistics (CBS), Darkush Subdistrict had a population of 23022 in the 2004 census.

References 

Subdistricts of Idlib Governorate